William Moore Butt (1805–1888) was a politician in Georgia.

Butt arrived in Atlanta in 1851 from Campbell County, Georgia, where he had been an Inferior Court judge, and became a merchant.  He served as a councilman in 1853. The next year he was elected the eighth mayor.

References

 

Mayors of Atlanta
1805 births
1864 deaths
19th-century American politicians